Nathan Knox (born 13 July 1981 in Christchurch, New Zealand) is a former professional soccer player who played in the US for Minnesota, Seattle and Atlanta.

Career

College and Amateur
Knox played college soccer for Macalester College in St. Paul, Minnesota while completing his degree, and spent his summers playing semi-professional football in his native New Zealand, for Rangers and Canterbury United in the New Zealand Football Championship.

Professional
Knox signed his first professional contract in 2006 with Minnesota Thunder of the USL First Division. In 2007, he moved to the Seattle Sounders in the same league before transferring to the Atlanta Silverbacks in the spring of 2008.

On 8 August 2008, the Silverbacks traded Knox back to the Minnesota Thunder in exchange for Aaron Paye.

Honors

Seattle Sounders
USL First Division Commissioner's Cup: 2007

References

External links
 Minnesota Thunder bio

1981 births
Living people
New Zealand association footballers
USL First Division players
Minnesota Thunder players
Seattle Sounders (1994–2008) players
Atlanta Silverbacks players
New Zealand expatriate association footballers
Association football forwards